It's Our Life! or La vie est à nous! is a 2005 French comedy film. It was directed by Gérard Krawczyk and starred Josiane Balasko and Sylvie Testud.

Plot
Blanche buries her husband, Camille. Everyone liked him in the village of Savoy. She visits a bistro, "The Stage" with her daughter, Louise. She put a cell phone in the coffin of her father so his mother "... can join at any time". Among the regulars of "The Stage" are Chip, son of a drunkard, and an alcoholic himself, to whom the two women complain of frequent competing bar of Louise Chevrier, "The Turn", across side of the road. Able to collect broken children, Louise, who believes in the power of words to heal the pain, also has a new resident, Julien refuge in his silence.

Cast

 Sylvie Testud as Louise Delhomme
 Josiane Balasko as Blanche Delhomme
 Michel Muller as The chip
 Eric Cantona as Pierre
 Catherine Hiegel as Lucie Chevrier
 Carole Weiss as Irène
 Maroussia Dubreuil as Cécile
 Celia Rosich as Marion
 Danny Martinez as Clément
 Jil Milan as José
 George Aguilar as Sky
 Jacques Mathou as M. Antoine
 Agnès Château as Madame Antoine
 Laurent Gendron as Alf
 Chantal Banlier as Marguerite
 Jean Dell as The priest
 Virginie Lemoine as The mother
 Jean-Paul Lilienfeld as The father
 Aline Kassabian as The baker

Development
The movie was screened at the VCU French Film Festival in 2007.

References

External links

2005 films
2005 comedy films
French comedy films
2000s French-language films
Films directed by Gérard Krawczyk
2000s French films